Pyura spinifera, commonly called the sea tulip, is a species of sessile ascidian that lives in coastal waters at depths of up to 80 m (260 feet).  As with almost all other ascidians, sea tulips are filter feeders. The common name comes from the organism's appearance - that of a knobbly 'bulb' or flower attached to a long stalk. Sea tulips come in a variety of colours, including white, pink, yellow, orange, and purple. The coloration of sea tulips depends upon their association with a symbiotic sponge that covers their surface.

References

WoRMS

External links
 Wildlife of Sydney - Sea Tulip

Stolidobranchia
Animals described in 1834